Syleus is a genus of harvestmen in the family Sclerosomatidae from India.

Species
 Syleus mysoreus Roewer, 1955
 Syleus niger (C.L.Koch, 1848)

References

Harvestmen
Harvestman genera